Jefferson County is a county located in the southern part of the U.S. state of Illinois. According to the 2020 census, it has a population of 37,113. The county seat is Mount Vernon.

Jefferson County contains the Mount Vernon, Illinois micropolitan area. It is located in the southern portion known locally as "Little Egypt".

The western border of the county adjoins the Greater St. Louis consolidated metropolitan statistical area, the Metro-East region, and the St. Louis commuter region and market and viewing area.

History
The first settler in Jefferson County is believed to have been Andrew Moore. In 1810, he settled near the southeast corner of the county, near where the Goshen Road emerges from the forest of Hamilton County into what is now known as Moore's Prairie. Moore arrived from the Goshen Settlement, near Edwardsville. His migration was therefore retrograde, from the west toward the interior of the State.

In 1814, Andrew Moore departed with his eight-year-old son for Jordan's settlement, a journey from which he never returned. A skull that was believed to have been Moore's was found several years later about two miles from his cabin. Jordan's Settlement, also called Jordan's Fort, was southeast of modern Thompsonville, Illinois, about twenty miles south of Moore's cabin. This episode occurred during the War of 1812 when many of the Indian tribes were allied with the British.

In 1816, Carter Wilkey, Daniel Crenshaw and Robert Cook settled in Moore's Prairie. Daniel Crenshaw moved into Moore's cabin. This settlement is believed to be the first permanent settlement in the county.

Jefferson County was organized in 1819, out of parts of White, Edwards and Franklin Counties. It was named in honor of Thomas Jefferson, principal draftsman of the Northwest Ordinance, among other things. The baseline along the northern border of the County crosses the Third Principal Meridian at the northwest corner of the county.

Geography

Climate and weather

Major highways
  Interstate 57
  Interstate 64
  U.S. Highway 51
  Illinois Route 15
  Illinois Route 37
  Illinois Route 142
  Illinois Route 148

Transit
 List of intercity bus stops in Illinois

Adjacent counties
 Marion County - north
 Wayne County - northeast
 Hamilton County - southeast
 Franklin County - south
 Perry County - southwest
 Washington County - west

Demographics

As of the 2010 United States Census, there were 38,827 people, 15,365 households, and 10,140 families residing in the county. The racial makeup of the county was 88.4% white, 8.4% black or African American, 0.6% Asian, 0.2% American Indian, 0.8% from other races, and 1.6% from two or more races. Those of Hispanic or Latino origin made up 2.1% of the population. In terms of ancestry, 24.3% were German, 15.8% were Irish, 13.6% were English, and 10.2% were American.

Of the 15,365 households, 30.1% had children under the age of 18 living with them, 50.0% were married couples living together, 11.4% had a female householder with no husband present, 34.0% were non-families, and 29.1% of all households were made up of individuals. The average household size was 2.38 and the average family size was 2.92. The median age was 40.6 years.

The median income for a household in the county was $41,161 and the median income for a family was $51,262. Males had a median income of $41,193 versus $29,645 for females. The per capita income for the county was $21,370. About 12.4% of families and 17.1% of the population were below the poverty line, including 24.8% of those under age 18 and 10.7% of those age 65 or over.

Agencies
In 2015 the county police department announced that the words "In God We Trust" will be on police squad cars.

Jeff Bullard is the current Sheriff of Jefferson County.

Politics
Jefferson is politically a fairly typical “anti-Yankee” Southern Illinois county. Opposition to the “Yankee” Republican Party and that party's Civil War meant that Jefferson County voted solidly Democratic until Theodore Roosevelt carried the county in his 1904 landslide. It was to again vote Republican in the greater landslides of 1920 and 1928, but otherwise was firmly Democratic until World War II.

Following the New Deal, Jefferson became something of a bellwether county, voting for every winning Presidential candidate between 1928 and 2004 except in the Catholicism-influenced 1960 election, and that of 1988 which was heavily influenced by a major Midwestern drought. Disagreement with the Democratic Party's liberal views on social issues since the 1990s has caused a powerful swing to the GOP in the past quarter-century: as is typical of the Upland South, Barack Obama in 2012 and Hillary Clinton did far worse than any previous Democrat.

Communities

Cities
 Mount Vernon
 Nason

Villages

 Belle Rive
 Bluford
 Bonnie
 Dix
 Ina
 Waltonville
 Woodlawn

Census-designated place
 Opdyke

Other unincorporated communities

 Bakerville
 Boyd
 Camp Ground
 Dareville
 Divide
 Drivers
 Harmony
 Roaches
 Scheller
 Texico

Townships
Jefferson County is divided into sixteen townships:

 Bald Hill
 Blissville
 Casner
 Dodds
 Elk Prairie
 Farrington
 Field
 Grand Prairie
 McClellan
 Moore's Prairie
 Mt. Vernon
 Pendleton
 Rome
 Shiloh
 Spring Garden
 Webber

Education
School districts include:

K-12:

 Bluford Unit School District 318
 Hamilton County Community Unit School District 10
 Sesser-Valier Community Unit School District 196
 Waltonville Community Unit School District 1
 Wayne City Community Unit School District 100
 Woodlawn Unit District 209

Secondary:

 Benton Consolidated High School District 103
 Centralia High School District 200
 Mount Vernon Township High School District 201
 Nashville Community High School District 99 - Primary school can go to Woodlawn School
 Salem Community High School District 600

Elementary:

 Ashley Community Consolidated School District 15 - Can attend secondary school in Woodlawn
 Bethel School District 82
 Centralia School District 135
 Ewing Northern Community Consolidated District 115
 Farrington Community Consolidated School District 99 - Can attend secondary school at Bluford
 Field Community Consolidated School District 3
 Grand Prairie Community Consolidated School District 6 - Can attend secondary school in Woodlawn
 Kell Consolidated School District 2
 McClellan Community Consolidated School District 12
 Mount Vernon School District 80 - Can attend elementary school at Bluford and Woodlawn
 Opdyke-Belle Rive Community Consolidated School District 5 - Can attend secondary school at Bluford
 Spring Garden Community Consolidated School District 178
 Rome Community Consolidated School District 2 - Can attend secondary school in Woodlawn
 Summersville School District 79

See also
 National Register of Historic Places listings in Jefferson County, Illinois

References

 
Illinois counties
1819 establishments in Illinois
Populated places established in 1819
Jefferson County, Illinois
Mount Vernon, Illinois micropolitan area